The Balderschwang Yew is an ancient European yew (Taxus baccata) in Bavaria. It has two hollow trunks and stands alone on a mountain pasture. It is estimated to be between 600 and 1,000 years old, and is possibly the oldest tree in Germany.

Location
Its location is to the northeast of Balderschwang and to the west of Sonthofen; it overlooks the rolling foothills of the Bavarian Alpine Foreland.

The tree

The yew has two separate trunks. The comparison of morphological features of the leaves and the time of their sprouting suggested that the trunks belonged to the same root system and a DNA test proved that they form a single organism. It is not known whether a central trunk existed: Ullrich, Kühn, and Kühn mention the possibility that the trunks regrew from a stump left after a forest clearing or natural decay, but also mention the opinion of other experts who believe the tree always had two trunks.

The tree has been battered by storms and the weight of snow lying on the branches. The trunks are hollow but the tree's foliage is complete and it still sends out fresh shoots. The yew is male.

Age

The tree possesses the characteristics of an ancient yew and its age was estimated at between 600 and 1,000 years. Ullrich, Kühn, and Kühn estimated an age of up to 800 years, even if the trunks have not regrown from a stump. If they have, the tree would be much older.

See also
 List of individual trees

Notes

References

External links

Municipality web page (in German)

Individual yew trees
Natural monuments in Bavaria
Individual trees in Germany